Celtic Resources  Holdings is a mining company based in Dublin, Ireland.  CRH owns and operates gold mines, including the Suzdal Mine and Zherek Mine in Kazakhstan.  The company recently sold its share of the South Verkhoyansk Mining Company (SVMC), which operates the Nezhdaninskoye Mine in the Sakha Republic/Yakutia in Russia.

Celtic Resources holds a shares in two UK companies: Eureka Mining Plc, a molybdenum company in Kazakhstan working the Shorskoye deposits in Kazakhstan; and of Victoria Oil & Gas Plc which operates in Central Asia.

In December 2007 Celtic Resources Holdings Plc was acquired by Centroferve Ltd (a subsidiary of Severstal Resurs) for cash at £2.90 per share. On 22 January 2008 Celtic delisted from AIM.

External links
Celtic Resources Holdings
Eureka Mining
Victoria Oil and Gas

Companies based in Dublin (city)
Gold mining companies
Mining companies of Kazakhstan